James Pieronnet Pierce (c. 1825–1897) was a California pioneer entrepreneur.

Family
James Pieronnet Pierce's father Henry Miller Pierce was born in Axminster, Devonshire, England.  His mother, Susan Pieronnet, whose parents were both French, was born in Wayford, England.  In 1820, she, with her parents, moved from England to Friendsville, Pennsylvania, and was soon followed by Henry Miller Pierce, whose father, John Harvey Pierce, had offered $10,000 to any of his sons who would go to America to live.

Early life
James P. Pierce was born on 25 Aug 1825 in Friendsville, Pennsylvania, where he remained until he reached his majority when he moved west and there engaged in the business of general merchandising at Constantine, Michigan.  There he met Miss Amelia Ann Pease, a native of Ann Arbor, whom he married in Jackson, Michigan 25 Aug 1852; he was then just twenty-seven years of age, and she seventeen, and together they came to California in 1854, reaching San Francisco, California by way of the Isthmus. Almost immediately, they went to Yuba County, and there at Smartsville, California, Mr. Pierce engaged in hydraulic mining becoming a leading operator before he sold out in 1878.

San Francisco Sea Wall
He might have continued uninterruptedly in that important field, had not the death of a brother-in-law, A. H. Houston, drawn him back to San Francisco to take charge of an entirely different enterprise. Mr. Houston, as early as 1867, had undertaken to build part of the seawall along the San Francisco waterfront, under contract with the board of state harbor commissioners, and when he died he had finished only a part of that great undertaking and had gone to great expense in quarrying and cutting granite. Mr. Pierce succeeded to Mr. Houston’s interests and completed 1130 feet of the new sea wall under a new and enlarged contract, receiving as his compensation $240 per linear foot.

Mining Interests
From 1868, for seven or eight years, Mr. Pierce’s family lived in San Francisco, and during that time he established general offices there, although his main interests continued to be the exploitation of hydraulic mining properties in Yuba County, which he still operated for many years after finishing the sea wall. He continued to own and operate the Blue Gravel Mine, which was enlarged to include a water proposition and a large lot of land, and renamed it The Excelsior Water and Mining Company, under which title it was conducted until sold in 1881 to a syndicate composed of James Ben Ali Haggin & Lloyd Tevis, and others.  His interest in this deal amounted to $600,000.

New Park Estate, Santa Clara
In 1866, he purchased from Mr. Lent a very beautiful country home, occupying eighty-eight acres on the west side of Santa Clara, California naming the place “New Park,” after the country home of his grandfather in England.  The price paid to Mr. Lent was $48,500, a very large sum for those days.  It abutted Franklin Street and included what is now the country home of R.T. Pierce. Pierce had the property managed for a period of this time by Harry Pickstone an Englishman who later migrated to South Africa where he engaged at Boschendal in the fruit business with Cecil Rhodes. It also included New Park House a fruit orchard nursery, a vineyard and winery, servant's quarters, pasture, and stables. Upon his death, this property was sold to Judge Hiram Bond who continued to operate it. After Judge Bond's death, the property was sold to Senator James D. Phelan who constructed a Discalced Carmelite Nunnery which is still there as of 2022. The winery operation was sold to a family of British immigrants named the Braces. While they were living there the Bonds hosted the author Jack London who had been their tenant handyman during the 1897 and 1898 Klondike Gold Rush. London used the estate as the opening scene of the novel The Call of the Wild.

Pacific Manufacturing Co.
In 1877 Mr. Pierce bought a small planing mill in Santa Clara and changed its name from Enterprise Mill to the Pacific Manufacturing Company, and incorporated it in 1879.  He purchased some timber lands in the Santa Cruz Mountains and built a sawmill at Ben Lomond, California, and put in the first band saw to be operated in California.  Mr. Pierce at one time owned the Empire Gold Mine in Grass Valley, California which he sold in 1872 to the father of W.B. Bourn for $150,000.  This mine was developed by the Bourns into one of the largest and most profitable in the state.  Soon after organizing the Pacific Manufacturing Company, Mr. Pierce became quite active as a lumberman and in addition to the Ben Lomond Mill, he purchased timber lands and built a sawmill at Ash Creek at the foot of Mount Shasta.  At this time he was a pioneer in the sugar and white pine industry.  He founded the Bank of Santa Clara County and erected the building that it occupied on the corner of Main and Franklin streets.  He served as a trustee of Mills Seminary, afterward Mills College, for many years, devoting a great deal of time to its interests and making it many gifts.

Descendants
Seven children survived Mr. and Mrs. Pierce—all were born in California.

(1) The eldest son, James Henry Pierce, was born on 25 Apr 1856. He was president of the Pacific Manufacturing Company, and resided at a house he had Julia Morgan design at 1650 the Alameda) in San Jose, California. James married Marion Percy Thurston, and they had two daughters, Edith Pierce, the wife of John Graeff Kennedy Jr. of Palo Alto, California, and Mildred T. Pierce, who was the wife of George Corner Fenhagen, a prominent architect in Baltimore, Maryland.

(2) Richard Thurston Pierce, born 04 Aug 1857, married Mary Grace O'Brien. He was the treasurer of the Pacific Manufacturing Company and resided on one of the finest fruit ranches in the Santa Clara Valley and has a beautiful home.

(3) Caroline Louise Pierce, born in Jun 1860, became Mrs. William J. Casey, an attorney who resided in Palo Alto. They had one adopted daughter, Ruth, who married Arthur G. Brown, with whom she had two daughters, Caroline Louise and Florence Pierce, both born in California. William Casey died in 1908, and Caroline in 1910.

(4) Anna A. Pierce, known as Annie, was born in Jan 1863. She married  Frank D. Goodhue, with whom she had two daughters, Elizabeth and Ann, both born in Cincinnati, Ohio. The family later resided in Pasadena, California.

(5) Grace Isabel Pierce, born in Jun 1869, became Mrs. Frank Delano Madison, one of the founding partners of the law firm Pillsbury, Madison & Sutro (now Pillsbury Winthrop). They had three children: Marshall Pierce Madison (Elena Atherton Eyre), Margaret (Wakefield Baker), and Caroline (Charles O. Martin). Grace died young. Frank died in San Francisco on 30 Jun 1941.

(6) Florence Pierce, born in Mar 1868, became Mrs. Frederick Hope Beaver Sr., with whom she had four children, Grace, Frederick Jr., Miriam, and Peter, all born in San Francisco.

(7) Frances Pierce was born on 12 Nov 1871. She married Lester Langford Morse, son of the co-founder of the Ferry-Morse Seed Company.  Frances and Lester had two children. Lester Morse died in Santa Clara, California 05 Nov 1953. Frances (Pierce) Morse died on 29 May 1955, also in Santa Clara.

Amelia (Pease) Pierce died in 1886. James P. Pierce died on February 26, 1897, and was buried beside his wife in Laurel Hill Cemetery, San Francisco, now defunct. Markers for Amelia and James were placed at Lone Mountain Cemetery, San Francisco.

References

 Attribution: 

Santa Clara Biographies 1922:; James Pieronnet Pierce
James Pieronnet Pierce and New Park
Bank of Santa Clara, James P. Pierce President

1897 deaths
American manufacturing businesspeople
Year of birth uncertain
1825 births
People from Constantine, Michigan
19th-century American businesspeople
Burials at Laurel Hill Cemetery (San Francisco)